The 1891–92 Scottish Districts season is a record of all the  rugby union matches for Scotland's district teams.

History

In September, new scoring was introduced throughout Scotland, England, Ireland and Wales. The Scottish Referee newspaper was disdainful of the changes; stating that although they were a step in the right direction, the changes did not go far enough. It concluded:

Indeed, the whole system of scoring as adopted is a survival of the time - the stupid time - when one goal was considered of greater value than any number of tries.

This is the first season that Glasgow District was scheduled to play South of Scotland District; and that Edinburgh District was again scheduled to play North of Scotland. Prior to this year, Glasgow always played North of Scotland District; and Edinburgh always played South of Scotland District.

However both matches, due to be played on 14 December, were called off on account of frost.

The North v Midlands match of 28 November 1891 at North Inch, Perth was called off due to heavy rainfall.

The North v Midlands match of 2 January 1892 at North Inch, Perth was postponed.

North and South were due to play on  Monday 18 January 1892 at Raeburn Place in Edinburgh.

East and West played their Trial match on 23 January 1892. Admission was noted as 1 shilling.

Results

Inter-City

Glasgow District:

Edinburgh District:

Other Scottish matches

Midlands District:

North of Scotland District: 

South of Scotland District:

Glasgow District: 

North of Scotland District:

Edinburgh District: 

East of Scotland District:

West of Scotland District:

English matches

No other District matches played.

International matches

No touring matches this season.

References

1891–92 in Scottish rugby union
Scottish Districts seasons